Sworn virgin may refer to:
 Celibacy, the state of voluntarily being unmarried and/or sexually abstinent
 Albanian sworn virgins, women in parts of Albania who take a vow of chastity and present as male
 Sworn Virgin (film), 2015 drama directed by Laura Bispuri
 Sworn Virgins, studio album by Omar Rodríguez-López